The William F. Perry Monument is an historical gravestone located at Fairview Cemetery in Bowling Green, Kentucky.  It is an oversized limestone headstone.

It marks the grave of Confederate general William F. Perry of the Army of Northern Virginia, who would after the war serve on the faculty of Ogden College in Bowling Green, which is now Western Kentucky University. It was placed by his students at the college after he died on December 7, 1901.

On July 17, 1997, it was one of sixty-one Civil War monuments in Kentucky added to the National Register of Historic Places, as part of the Civil War Monuments of Kentucky Multiple Property Submission.  One other monument on the list, the Confederate Monument of Bowling Green, is nearby in Fairview Cemetery.

Gallery

References

Civil War Monuments of Kentucky MPS
National Register of Historic Places in Bowling Green, Kentucky
Confederate States of America monuments and memorials in Kentucky
1901 sculptures
1901 establishments in Kentucky